Tim or Timothy Harris may refer to:

 Tim Harris (Catholic bishop) (born 1962), sixth Bishop of the Roman Catholic Diocese of Townsville
 Tim Harris (Anglican bishop), assistant bishop in the Anglican Diocese of Adelaide
 Tim Harris (drummer) (1948–2007), drummer for The Foundations
 Tim Harris (footballer) (born 1959), English football manager
 Tim Harris (cornerback) (born 1995), American football player
 Tim Harris (linebacker) (born 1964), American football linebacker for Green Bay Packers, Philadelphia Eagles and San Francisco 49ers
 Tim Harris (running back) (born 1961), American football player
 Tim Harris (South African politician) (born c. 1979), South African Member of Parliament
 Tim Harris (Indiana politician), American politician from the state of Indiana
 Tim Harris (soccer) (born 1961), U.S. soccer player
 Tim Harris (biochemist) (born 1950), molecular biologist and biochemist
 Timothy Harris (born 1964), Prime Minister of Saint Kitts and Nevis
 Timothy Harris (writer) (born 1946), American author, screenwriter and producer
 Timothy J. G. Harris (born 1958), historian
 Tim Harris (attorney), former Tulsa DA and school board candidate

See also
 Harris (surname)